Dira Betachtonim is a concept in Chabad philosophy describing the process of manifesting the presence of God within the world. Dirah Batachtonim is discussed primarily by the fifth Chabad Rebbe, Rabbi Sholom Dovber Schneersohn, in his Samech Vov series of Hasidic treatises. In the Samech Vov series, this idea is pronounced as the ultimate purpose of creation.

Central to the Dirah Betachtonim concept is the notion of sublimating the physical aspects of existence.

Attribution
The concept of a divine dwelling is attributed to a statement in Midrash Tanchuma, an Talmudic book of homilies, “God had a desire to have a home in the lower world.”

As a theological system
The concept of Dirah Betachtonim is the central focus of the book Heaven on Earth by Rabbi Faitel Levin. According to Levin, Dirah Betachtonim is not a solitary concept in Chabad philosophy, but represents a complete theological approach to the practice of Judaism.

Comparisons
In Chabad philosophy, Dirah Betachtonim has been compared to the type of divine manifestation in the World of Atzilut. The divine presence in Atzilut is thought to be especially profound; Dirah Betachtonim is thought as the attempt to mimic that manifestation within the World of Assiah.

References

Chabad-Lubavitch (Hasidic dynasty)
Chabad philosophy
Chabad terminology
Jewish philosophical concepts